WB 11 may refer to one of the following television stations that were formerly affiliated with The WB:
 KBDA, Amarillo, Texas (cable-only affiliate)
 KPLR-TV, St. Louis, Missouri
 KZWB, Eugene, Oregon (cable-only affiliate)
 WPIX, New York, New York